Umm er Rus, alternate spelling Um Ra'us (literal meaning: "mother of the summits"), is a Roman-Byzantine era ruin that sits high on a spur in the Judean mountains, overlooking the Elah valley. The site was formerly known in Arabic as Umm er Rûs esh-Shamālīya ("the northern Umm er Rus"), to distinguish it from another site by the same name, lying on an adjacent hill to its south. The site takes its Arabic name from the prospect that it affords, having the broad connotation of "the place with the hill-top." Its older Hebrew appellation is no longer known. The ruin is located a little less than 1 mile northeast of Aviezer.

History 
The village, during Israel's Second Temple period, was located in the district known then as Idumaea, named presumably for its inhabitants who were descended from the progeny of Esau, their ancestor, and who came to embrace the Jewish religion in the days of John Hyrcanus. By the mid-1st-century CE, the inhabitants of this district sought independence from the yoke of the Roman Imperial army. Nothing is known of the village's demise, although it can be assumed that, owing to its proximity to Bethletephon (Beit Nettif), the village fell along with Bethletephon during the initial Roman onslaught of that region by Vespasian, who sent against them the Tenth and Fifteenth legions, in an effort to quell the insurrection.

He (Vespasian) came to the toparchy of Bethletephon. He then destroyed that place, and the neighboring places, by fire, and fortified, at proper places, the strong holds all about Idumaea; and when he had seized upon two villages, which were in the very midst of Idumaea, Betaris and Caphartobas, he slew above ten thousand of the people, and carried into captivity above a thousand, and drove away the rest of the multitude, and placed no small part of his own forces in them, who overran and laid waste the whole mountainous country.

The site may have been resettled and destroyed a second time during the outbreak of hostilities under Hadrian, a time of great upheaval and unrest in Judea, as described by Cassius Dio's Roman History.

Fifty of their most important outposts and nine hundred and eighty-five of their most famous villages were  razed to the ground. Five hundred and eighty thousand men were slain in the various raids and battles, and the number of those that perished by famine, disease and fire was past finding out. Thus nearly the whole of Judaea was made desolate .

In 1883 the PEF's Survey of Western Palestine described the "Umm ar Rus": "Foundations, walls, and cisterns. They appear to be Crusading work."

Description 

Potsherds are strewn across its grounds, with several razed houses, one of which showing several courses of large, hewn ashlars, measuring upwards of 2 metres. A wall which once served as the village's defences is broken down. A rock-cut tomb lay on the village's western-most quarter. A massive stone-carved well-covering is seen partially upturned over the mouth of the village well, in its eastern quarters.

Umm er Rus (southern site) 

The site was inhabited by Jews during the early and late Roman era period, based on the discovery of a ritual bath in situ. To distinguish it from its sister site to the north, the southern site has been given the additional name Ḥorbat Beit Bad ("the ruin of the olive press"). A Byzantine Church is known to have existed at the site in late antiquity, where was discovered in 1898 a dedicatory inscription to St. John in Greek and Syriac. A crypt belonging to the church, with arcosolia in the walls, was resurveyed in 2014 by inspectors from the Antiquities Theft Prevention Unit following damage to the site caused by antiquities looters. According to archaeologist Eitan Klein, the cave walls were coated with gray plaster of the type characteristic of the Second Temple period, suggesting that this was a ritual bath from that period that was later converted into a burial cave. 

Wine presses are noticeable on the site, cisterns, underground storage facilities, as well as a rock-cut, plastered ritual bath (mikveh), hewn in a trapezoidal manner and measuring approximately 3.1–3.6 x 3.6–4.1 m (10.1–11.8 x 11.8–13.4 ft.), connected to a large underground water reservoir (approximately 9 x 8 m). The potsherds and fragments of a spindle-like bottle attest to a Jewish settlement in the 2nd century BCE to the 2nd century CE.

The site has a history of being plagued by antiquities robbers.

Further reading

Gallery

References

Bibliography

External links 
Survey of Western Palestine, 1880 Map, Map 17: IAA, Wikimedia commons, showing both the northern and southern sites of Umm er Rûs (appx. East longitude, 35.01; North latitude, 31.41)
 "Khirbat Umm er-Rûs", Hadashot Arkheologiyot, Excavations and Surveys in Israel, Boaz Zissu and Amir Ganor 

Ancient villages in Israel
Former populated places in Israel
Tells (archaeology)
Archaeological sites in Israel
Geography of Palestine (region)
Ancient Jewish settlements of Judaea
Archaeology of Palestine (region)